Gors Castle is a 19th-century country house, in Gors-Opleeuw in the municipality of Borgloon, province of Limburg, Belgium.

The original structure was a house of the 17th century, which was almost entirely rebuilt in the 1820s in a Neo-Classical style. The farm that was originally attached to the house was demolished in 1865 and rebuilt further away. Both house and farm have been protected monuments since 1986.

See also
List of castles in Belgium

External links
Gors Castle, Kastelen in Limburg 

Castles in Belgium
Castles in Limburg (Belgium)